Leonard Edwin Wild (22 January 1935 – 10 July 2020) was a Canadian basketball player. He competed in the men's tournament at the 1956 Summer Olympics.

References

External links
 

1935 births
2020 deaths
Basketball players at the 1956 Summer Olympics
Canadian men's basketball players
1959 FIBA World Championship players
Olympic basketball players of Canada
Basketball players from Vancouver
UBC Thunderbirds baseball players
UBC Thunderbirds basketball players